The Tensaw River is a river in Baldwin County, Alabama.

The name Tensaw is derived from the historic indigenous Taensa people.

Overview

The Tensaw flows alongside the Mobile and Middle rivers, with the Tensaw being the easternmost flowing river. There are numerous back channels extending off the main channel into Baldwin County.

See also
Mobile-Tensaw River Delta
List of Alabama rivers

References

Rivers of Baldwin County, Alabama
Rivers of Alabama
Tributaries of Mobile Bay
Alabama placenames of Native American origin